Brian Skeet is an English director, writer, producer, and cinematographer. His work includes Documentaries, Films and Short films, a lot of it touching on romance and the HIV/AIDS crisis.

Biography 
Skeet was born on November 21st, 1965 in London. His father was a tailor and he attended high school in Maine. He acted in the musical Anything Goes. At 17 years old he directed his first film - a student production of The Normal Heart. He attended University at Cambridge, and while studying played Max in a performance of The Homecoming. Skeet achieved a First with honors and graduated, subsequently working for the BBC. He worked with Peter Sellars to direct a production of The Merchant of Venice. After quitting his job at the BBC he made his first short film, The Boy Who Fell In Love, which he followed up by directing The Misadventures of Margaret, which was received well at Sundance Film Festival. He has been married to Terry Cummings since November 22nd, 2008, who has worked on writing several of his films.

Filmography

References

External links

Brian Skeet's Slated page

1965 births
Living people
English film directors
English film producers
English-language film directors